Ellenbrook could be

In the United Kingdom:
Ellenbrook, Greater Manchester
Ellenbrook, Hertfordshire

In Australia:
Ellenbrook, Western Australia